Aliabad-e Mohammad Qasem Khan (also Romanized as ‘Alīābād-e Moḩammad Qāsem Khān) is a village in Chahdegal Rural District, Negin Kavir District, Fahraj County, Kerman Province, Iran. At the 2006 census, its population was 876, in 201 families.

References 

Populated places in Fahraj County